Hoçaş Petrified Forest, also known as Seben Fossil Research Forest, is a petrified forest located in the Seben district of Bolu Province in Turkey. It was registered as a 1st Degree Natural Protected Area in 2005 by the Ankara Cultural and Natural Heritage Preservation Board. A total of 54 fossilized trees were identified in the forest, 51 in planted condition and 13 moved to other places.

References

Petrified forests
Geology of Turkey
Landforms of Bolu Province
Tourist attractions in Bolu Province